Rorschach is a 2022 Indian Malayalam-language neo-noir psychological thriller film directed by Nissam Basheer and produced by Mammootty under, Mammootty Kampany. It stars Mammootty, Sharafudheen, Jagadish, Grace Antony, Bindu Panicker, Kottayam Nazeer, Sanju Sivram and Asif Ali. The film's music was composed by Midhun Mukundan and cinematography was handled by Nimish Ravi. In the film, an NRI businessman with a mysterious past, sets on a mission to exact vengeance from someone who has destroyed him deeply.

Principal photography began on 30 March 2022 at Chalakudy, and the film was released on 7 October 2022.

Plot
 
Luke Anthony is an NRI businessman in Dubai who goes to Kerala with his pregnant wife Sofiya for a vacation. While travelling through the forest they have a road accident. Upon gaining consciousness, he finds Sofiya is missing and reports it to the local police. The cops close the case, as they deduce that Sofiya was killed by a tiger. Luke decides to find her on his own. Luke stumbles upon Balan, who asks him to purchase his house on the outskirts of the forest. He tells Luke that the house was owned by his elder son, Dileep Balan, who died in an accident, a few months ago.

After selling Luke the house, Balan leaves with the money, intending to leave his wife, Sujatha Balan and young son for his second family. However, Balan is found murdered and the money missing. When asked by the cops, his first wife Seetha and younger son Anil deny knowing anything about the sale of the house or the money. Meanwhile, it is revealed that Sofiya was murdered by Dilip in a Rorschach mask, so with no opportunity for revenge, Luke stays there as a semi-retreat. However, Luke starts feeling Dilip's presence in the house and deduces that Dileep's spirit is present there, and Dilip's mother's confirmation about the same gives him the vigour for revenge.

Luke meets Balan's son-in-law, Shashankan, and suggests they investigate Balan's murder and the missing money. Shashankan refuses, and it is revealed that he has Balan's money. However, Shashankan finds his storeroom burnt, and the money missing. It is revealed that Luke retrieved the money and set fire to the storeroom. Shashankan reveals his suspicion that Luke was responsible for the incident to Anil, and it is revealed that Anil learnt about Balan's plan to leave, killed him and kept the money in the storeroom, on the advice of Shashankan. That night, Anil and Shashankan break into Luke's house to steal the money. Luke subdues them, but they manage to escape. 

While escaping, Anil gets into an accident. Luke helps the family, with the medical expenses and convinces Dilip's widow, Sujatha, to agree with transfer of Seetha's shares of the cashew nut processing factory and merge their businesses. She reluctantly agrees. Sathisan, gets suspicious that Luke attacked Ammu, Luke's domestic worker, and tries to kill him, as Sathisan has feelings for Ammu. He learns that Ammu left for her village and Luke compensated her for her friendliness with the money he retrieved from Balan. Luke is admitted to the hospital, there he tries to flirt with Sujatha, but she avoids him. Sujatha learns that the skull from Dileep's corpse has been stolen.

Luke seeks permission to marry Sujatha from Seetha, who agrees despite of Sujatha's appeals. After the marriage, Seetha seals down Sujatha's factory, and Luke plays a key role in it. A cop named Ashraf, starts investigating Luke's past. He learns about Dileep's crimes and the suffering caused by him to Luke with his friend Shafi, and deduces Luke came prepared for vengeance, but is now staying there to torture Dileep's family, as he cannot get his hands on Dileep, who is already dead. Learning about the robbery and that Dileep's family might have money left from robbing Luke, Ashraf demands a hefty bribe from Seetha to not tarnish Dileep's reputation. However, she kills him by poisoning his drink and makes Anil and Shashankan bury him in the backyard. Sujatha gets fed up with Luke and leaves him. 

Later, Sujatha learns about Dileep's crimes, which makes her to hate Dileep, and she burns down the factory. Seetha visits Luke and reveals that both Dilip and Anil were following her orders to gain more money by committing crimes. Luke realizes Seetha should be killed, as her sons were just following her orders. Anil and his men go to Luke's house to try and kill him, but Luke kills Anil. Seetha, who witnesses this, manages to escape. Sujatha complains to the police, about Dilip and Anil. Shashankan, reveals Ashraf's murder by the family. Seetha is arrested, while Luke surrenders to the police. In the local prison, Luke learns that Seetha has committed suicide, which makes him happy, knowing that he finally avenged Sofiya's death and extinguished Dilip's spiritual presence by destroying all his physical ties.

Cast 
 
Mammootty as Luke Antony 
Asif Ali as Dileep Kumar Balan
Sharafudheen as Satheeshan Madathil
Jagadeesh as Head Constable Ashraf
Grace Antony as Sujatha, Dileep's wife and Luke Antony's second wife 
Bindu Panicker as Seetha G Balan, Dileep and Anil's mother
Kottayam Nazeer as Shashankan, brother-in-law of dileep and Anil
Sanju Sivram as Anil Kumar Balan, Dileep's younger brother
Ira Noor as Sofiya Luke, Luke's wife
George Abraham as Constable
Priyamvada Krishnan as Ammu, a Local Prostitute
Riyas Narmakala
Mani Shornur as Balan, Dileep and Anil's father
Jordi Poonjar as CI John
Jimmi Joseph as Constable Sini
Sreeja Ravi as Lekha, Sujatha's mother
Mohan Raj as Vishvanathan, Sujatha's father
Zeenath as Satheeshan's mother
Geethi Sangeetha as Nurse
Gilu Joseph as constable
Babu Annur as SI Saji

Production

Development 
Rorschach is the second direction of Nissam Basheer, after Kettyolaanu Ente Malakha. The film is produced by Mammootty under the banner Mammootty Kampany, with NM Badusha as co-producer. The film is written by Sameer Abdul. Shaji Naduvil is the art director and Prashanth Narayan is the production controller of the film.

Filming 
Principal photography began on 30 March 2022 at Chalakudy. Mammootty joined the sets from 3 April. After the completion of the shoot in Kerala by mid-June, the team moved to Dubai for the final schedule. On 1 July 2022, the makers announced that filming has been completed.

Music 
Midhun Mukundan composed songs and scores for the film, which marks his debut in Malayalam cinema.

Marketing
Global audio launch of the movie has been conducted at Doha.

Release

Theatrical
The film was released on 7 October 2022 in theatres.

Home media
The digital rights of the film is acquired by Disney+ Hotstar and started streaming from 11 November 2022. While, the satellite rights of the film is owned by Asianet.

Reception

Box office 

Critical response 
Manoj Kumar R of The Indian Express gave the film 4/5, writing that, 'Mammootty magnificently embodies the psychological condition of a man with bottomless vengeance'. The News Minute rated the film 3.5/5, and found the film to be 'dark & interesting', further writing that 'director Nissam puts his powerful women characters in the ordinary garbs of village women, behaving like the typical mother or grieving wife, but exposing their depths when the time comes'. S.R. Praveen of The Hindu found the film to be 'an effective psychological thriller that has its imperfections, just like the test that it draws its name from, but it is nevertheless an intriguing experience'. Soundarya Athimuthu of The Quint wrote, 'deploying a compelling visual-storytelling and oscillating between the past and the present in a smooth fashion, Rorschach promises an immersive experience if you are willing to pay the full-attention it deserves'. Princy Alexander of Onmanorama found the film to 'hit all the right notes, except in the end', though she praised Mammootty by writing that 'his movements are swift, the mysterious aura is intact and the dialogues are enough to thrill you thrill you till the end', & adding that his achievement onscreen is 'pure brilliance'. Times of India rated 4 on 5 and praised the layered screenplay and performances of lead actors.

References

External links 
 

Indian action thriller films
Indian psychological thriller films
Indian films about revenge
Self-reflexive films
2022 psychological thriller films
2020s mystery films
Indian mystery films
2022 crime drama films
2022 crime thriller films
Films about criminals
Films about mother–son relationships
Films about murderers
Films about bipolar disorder
Indian nonlinear narrative films
Indian avant-garde and experimental films
2020s avant-garde and experimental films
Films shot in Chalakudy
Films set in Kerala
Films shot in Kerala
Freudian psychology